Elliot James Mulhern (born 29 September 1989) is a British singer-songwriter, producer, and recording artist; member of act Extremely Bad Man and drummer of rock band Hey Monday. He is the founder of British-American record label Blossöm Records, ANOMILY MOTION PICTURES® & Fever Mint, Inc. His single "Smooth" from ALWAYS LATELY  premiered on Billboard and was mastered by Frank Arkwright at Abbey Road Studios on Blossöm Records, Ltd. He co-produced three records on Jallal's Off The Radar with Chad Hugo, Ne-Yo, and BJ the Chicago Kid.

Mulhern contributed to the vinyl release of Songs About Jane by pop rock band Maroon 5. The vinyl was pressed by ETR & Brookvale Records featuring a remix by Kanye West of the Grammy awarded song "This Love". In 2016, he worked on his second certified release Nickelodeon's, Best of Nick Toons. Mulhern parted Hey Monday at the end of 2009 touring with various acts and The Scene Aesthetic.

Early life 
He was born in London, the son of British interior designers Denis Mulhern and Jude Mulhern of Marzipan. He began playing drums at school in England, studying jazz and contemporary music before moving to the United States at age 13. Before Hey Monday's inception in 2007, Mulhern maintained a part in the South Florida music scene as a member of rock band Easton.

Music career

Hey Monday (2007–2009) 

Mulhern was a founding member of Hey Monday (previously named Blake). He met Cassadee Pope through the local music scene in South Florida and they were friends for years before forming a project. The band were signed to Columbia Records via A&R Jay Harren. Hey Monday recorded their debut album Hold On Tight with producer duo "S*A*M* & Sluggo", better known as Sam Hollander and Dave Katz. The album was released by Columbia Records and Decaydance, a label owned by Pete Wentz. Their single "How You Love Me Now" was the first song to go to Top 40 radio. Hey Monday performed at Bamboozle Left and Bamboozle Festival in 2009. The band joined The Cab with This Providence, and A Rocket To The Moon on the "Why So Serious? Tour" and supported We the Kings, The Academy Is... and Carolina Liar on "Bill and Trav's Bogus Journey Tour". In support of their debut album, the band toured extensively with Fall Out Boy and The All American Rejects internationally on the Believers Never Die Tour.

The band continued the second leg of the tour joining Fall Out Boy, Cobra Starship, 50 Cent, Metro Station and All Time Low on the Believers Never Die Tour Part Deux. Mulhern left the band in the final months of 2009 to pursue other musical interests.

Break Blossom (2011–2012) 
In the beginning of 2012 a leaked demo of the yet to be announced project was posted on the internet by Property Of Zach. Pete Wentz, A&R of Hey Monday and a friend of Mulhern had been involved early on during the band's formation.  The group released the album Last Night of Your Life on 15 May 2012. Their music video for "Dirt" was featured by Journey's Shoe in all retail locations for its release. Break Blossom supported A Day To Remember for a thanksgiving show in A Day To Remember's hometown Ocala, Thanksgiving of 2012; it would end up being the band's final show.

Production Music and Big Idea Music (2014–Present) 
In October, 2014 Mulhern announced the release of his first volume for the publishing company Big Idea Music. The album titled "BIM045 Indie Chillwave" was featured on BMG's BBF.

Collaborations and NTRL RBLS (2015) 
Mulhern' pop sound evolved to his urban pop, electronic blend leading to 2015, when he periodically released music under the moniker Baallet. Guest features led to the release of "Out Of My Mind (Honest)" Following "Out Of My Mind (Honest)", Mulhern premiered the song "Honey", produced with Drew Gilbert and Julio Traverez of As Tall As Lions, on Twist magazine. NTRL RBLS invited Mulhern to collaborate in spring of 2015 releasing "All Your Love" live on Dash Radio's "FeelGoodSound" the project performed at Andy Warhols Interview (magazine) event at Coachella Valley Music and Arts Festival.

Blossöm Records and Soft Dreams Osaka (2016) 
On 1 July, in conjunction with the release of Soft Dreams Osaka, the label Mulhern had founded was revealed to be Blossöm Records. The record label and its recording studio was based in Hollywood in Fairfax design district. The EP, inspired by the end of a tour in Japan, was released as a visual EP synchronized to a fully animated music video the same day it was announced. Soft Dreams Osakas songs can be played out of order or seamlessly as one cohesive work. James said his "fixture with pop attributed to its abilities to take someone from the underground and channel it on a larger universal scale" in the Roundtable Reactions series for The 59th GRAMMYs. James appeared with Zac Mann and Kaleena Zanders to discuss their peers and 2017 Pop Category Nominees.

Favourite EP and collaborations (2017) 
In spring of 2017, following his first release Soft Dreams Osaka, Mulhern announced his new EP would be titled Favourite. The first new song "Bones" from the EP was produced by frequent partner, Texas Drew. Other collaborators on the EP include Philadelphia producer Cobeshack on "Yesterdays Fashion" and "Rule My Entire World" featuring James Stein of The Neptunes group Stein Sang. The EP leaked online the day before its release. Before the release of the music video, "Yesterdays Fashion" was placed into rotation by KCRW FM in Los Angeles twenty four hours after the EP's release. The second single "Bones" was featured by Spotify on Fresh Finds: Hiptronix.

Mulhern produced three songs off Jallal's 2017 release Off The Radar. "Toss & Turn" featuring Ne-Yo was featured on Complex, Rap-Up, and Vibe and produced by Mulhern, Chad Hugo, and Jan Fairchild. "Never Forgotten" the second song released from Off the Radar features BJ the Chicago Kid, Georgia Anne Muldrow, and Kaye Fox produced by Fairchild and Mulhern.

"Fiend" and Extremely Bad Man (2018) 
Mulhern released the song and music video "Fiend" starring Natalie Eleftheriadis and directed by Joseph Mercado in April 2018. The original song was produced and mixed by James and produced by Evren Göknar (who has worked with Tupac Shakur, KISS, The Red Hot Chili Peppers, Good Charlotte, Mariah Carey, Iggy Pop, and NWA) at Capitol Records in Hollywood, California. The music video originally premiered on Apple Music and was featured and reviewed by Born Music in the UK calling it "singer-songwriter music taken to its most minimal extreme, the song is almost mist-like, having an almost air-like quality". The single and music video were distributed by Blossöm Records.

The urban indie rock project Extremely Bad Man from Julio Tavarez, Elliot James, Cobeshack, and Jeremy Michaels was announced in May 2018.  The album is released by James' record label Blossöm Records. The LP features MC’s / artists Omenihu, Alexis Moraites, Paige Garabito, Joe Zizzo, Steve Scalfati, and Jallal.

James and Tavarez joined with Northeast producer Cobeshack in summer 2017 to develop a new "concept sound". The group developed Bad Man's imagery with British artist Russ Murphy, also known by Ruff Mercy, and set the release of the album Love Is Pure on Friday 13 July 2018. The group mastered the LP at Capitol Records in Hollywood, CA with Evren Göknar.

ALWAYS LATELY - Debut LP (2019) 
Billboard first announced and premiered Always Lately in summer of 2019. "Smooth" was the first single released from the forthcoming album. Engineer Frank Arkwright mastered "Smooth" and "Filters" at Abbey Road Studios in London England. "Smooth" charted on Hype Machine in its initial release. "Smooth" is featured on Abbey Road Cuts by Abbey Road Studios on Spotify with The Beatles, Jonny Greenwood, Kae Tempest, Johnny Marr and Brian Eno. "Filters" the second single is co-produced by Cobeshack and the official music video is directed by Joseph Michael Mercado & Elliot James Mulhern. The choir sampled at the beginning of "Smooth" is an iPhone voice memo of his parents choir at Christmas. The record is released on 2 August 2019.

Tiny Correspondence, Dangerous Ideas and Sensitive Affairs - LP (2020) 
Contrast Magazine and Contrast Man featured Mulhern on the cover for the Fall / November 2020 issue  and premiered the news of the upcoming album, Tiny Correspondence, Dangerous Ideas and Sensitive Affairs. For the lead single How's It Gonna Stop?, Mulhern teamed up with Gavin Finn and Matt Schaeffer, as well as SZA's CTRL. The second single Dreamlove features Aaron Marsh, lead singer of the band Copeland. Dreamlove was mastered with Chris Gehringer. Elliot James Mulhern was a featured interview guest and performer on Z100 New York FM's show in the Summer of 2020 at the Dunkin' Latte Lounge. He was interviewed by DJ, TV Host, Garrett Vo of the Elvis Duran and the Morning Show.

Film Career

INSUFFERABLE or "... I Know You don't believe In God Still You Leave The House (Each Day) Praying To Run Into Me" (2022) 
In the Spring of 2022, the first single I Know premiered on Alfitude, who broke the news of Mulhern's feature film INSUFFERABLE, and album by the same name which was mastered at Abbey Road Studios by Christian Wright. The film features Clark Sims and Brandon Ferguson. Additional singles from the film are mastered by previous frequent collaborator of Mulhern's, Frank Arkwright.  It is released on ANOMILY MOTION PICTURES®, founded by Elliot James Mulhern and Justin Goodarz.

Discography

References

External links 
 

1989 births
Living people
British rock drummers
British male drummers
British rock singers
British rock pianists
British rock guitarists
British male guitarists
British male pianists
21st-century British singers
21st-century pianists
21st-century British guitarists
21st-century drummers
21st-century British male singers